Harp was a print and online magazine that provided in-depth information on current music, mainly the adult album alternative genre, which encompasses a large variety of music.  It was published from 2001 to 2008. The sister publication of Harp was Jazz Times.

History and profile
Harp was founded by Scott Crawford  in 2001. The magazine was published on a bimonthly basis. The headquarters was in Silver Spring, Maryland. By 2008, Harp had moved well beyond its early AAA roots to become a more general interest magazine (compared in the media to such publications as Mojo, Uncut, Spin, and Paste and Blender) with emphasis on the following genres: indie rock, pop, punk, Americana, psychedelia, and assorted underground subgenres. It was published eight times annually.

On March 17, 2008, Guthrie, Inc., the company that published Harp, officially announced that it would be suspending publication immediately.  The last issue sent to subscribers and newsstands was the March/April issue, featuring Dave Grohl on the cover.  In a note to subscribers, the publishers indicated that their assets and financial records were being submitted to bankruptcy courts.  The demise of Harp came on the heels of a similar announcement by No Depression and a number of other print magazines covering music. Staff of the magazine went on to found Blurt.

References

Bimonthly magazines published in the United States
Defunct magazines published in the United States
Magazines established in 2001  
Magazines disestablished in 2008  
Magazines published in Maryland
Online music magazines published in the United States